Bandua was a theonym used to refer to a god or goddess worshipped in Iberia by Gallaeci and Lusitanians. Whether the name referred to a discrete deity or was an epithet applied to different deities is arguable.

Epigraphy 
The deity's name is found, in epigraphy, with a series of epithets:

 Bandei Brialeacui (Beira Baixa);
 Bandi Oilienaeco (Beira Alta);
 Bandi [L?]ongobricus (Longroiva);
 Bandua(e) Lansbricae (Orense);
 Bandi Roudaecus (Trujillo);
 Bandua Roudeaco (Madroñera);
 Deo Ban[du] (Catoira, Pontevedra);
 Bandue Ae[t]obrigo (Sarreaus, Ourense);
 Bandue Bolecco (Palas de Rei, Lugo);
 Bandue Veigebreago (Xinzo de Limia, Ourense);
 Bandue (Ve/Ni)rubrico (Laza, Ourense).

In Rairiz de Veiga, Bandua is acknowledged as a god of the Vexillum and partner of Mars: 

At Espinhosela, the name Bandua alone is found. At Codosedo, Alenquer and Xinzo de Limia however, the name Bandua is qualified by the epithet Aetobrico(m). At Cáceres, Bandua is qualified by Araugelensis, at Curbián by Bolleco(m), at Miguel o Anjo by Brico(m), at Mixo(m) by Calaigus,  at La Mezquitilla by Itobrico(m), at Eiras by Lanobrica, at Rairiz de Veiga by Veigebreaeco(m), at Arcuelos by Verubrigo(m), at Seisco de Anciães by Vordeaeco(m) and at S. Martinho by Vorteaecio(m).

Extent of worship 
The theonym Bandua has been found recorded in Portugal and Galicia. Along with Cosus, Nabia and Reo, Bandua is one of the best documented deities in large areas of western and north-western Iberia: six epigraphies from the Province of Ourense.

It has been proposed that the worship of Bandua spread from the north (Gallaecia and Asturia) into the south (Lusitania), along with that of Cosus and Nabia, so contrasting with the worship of Reo that would have extended in the opposite direction.

According to scholars Jürgen Untermann and Blanca María Prósper, the form Bandue, and the form Bandua or Banduae, predominate in the Galician territory north of the Douro River, while the Bandi ~ Bande form is more common in the Lusitanian area to the south.

Professor Olivares Pedreño argues that, in relation to the attestation of epithets Roudeaco/Roudaecus, the name pertains to a place named uicus Rouda, and their discovery in different locations suggests a migration or population displacement.

Interpretations

Possible water deity
Bandua has been associated with water in order to explain the hydronym Banduje, in Portugal, or the toponym Banhos de Bande (a thermal spot whose medieval name, Vanate, is unrelated) and the proposed relationship of the name with fords.

Polish linguist Krzysztof Tomasz Witczak also sees some possible cognate relationship between Lusitanian Bandua and Illyrian god Bindus, a deity of water sources also equated to Roman Neptune.

Possible protective deity
Their epithets seem to allude more to dwelling places, at least those containing the element -briga or -bris, "fortress": Lanobrigae, Aetobrigo, than to the worshipping communities themselves. In the same vein, Olivares Pedreño, while calling Bandua a male deity, noted that their name is attested with place names (e.g., Etobrico, Brialeacui, Isibraiegui, Longobricu, Veigebreaego, Lansbricae), which seems to indicate its relation to ancient vici and castelle - locations distant from romanized population centers. In a later article by Olivares Pedreño, this association seems to highlight their connection with local indigenous communities, as their protector.

Divine pair
The "location theory" has been criticized by de Bernardo Stempel, who interprets what have traditionally been considered singular thematic datives of male attributes as plural genitive forms referring to groups of people (B'andue Aetobrico(m), Cadogo(m), Roudeaeco(m), Veigebreaego(m)). She also states that they depend on a theonym, Bandua, which would be feminine as a consequence of the above, and which was probably created later than its masculine counterpart. Thus, we would have a pair of deities, Bandus (male) and Bandua (female), comparable to other Celtic pairs like Bormanos & Bormana, Belisama & Belisamaros, Camulos & Camuloriga and Arentius & Arentia.

Other interpretations
In a 2000 article, María Prósper offered another etymology: a reconstructed stem *bandu- would account for variations Bandue, Bandi and Bandei, ultimately deriving from Proto-Indo-European *gʷem-tu-. Thus, she argued, they are a deity of passageways, akin to Roman Ianus.

Legacy 
Researcher Ladislao Castro Pérez proposed that St. Torquatus, one of the Seven Apostolic Men responsible for the introduction of Christianity to Hispania, whose relics are kept in Santa Comba de Bande (Ourense), may be a Christian version of Bandua.

References

Bibliography 
 .
 .
 .

Further reading 

 .
 .
 Mezo, Francisco Javier Burgaleta. "Bandua, diosa o dios, y los ritos del toro de San Marcos". In: Espacio, tiempo y forma. Serie II, Historia antigua, Nº 19-20, 2006-2007, pp. 381-397. .
 Sancho, Rosa María Pedrero. "Aproximación lingüística al teónimo lusitano-gallego Bandue/Bandi". In: Pueblos, lenguas y escrituras en la Hispania prerromana: actas del VII Coloquio sobre Lenguas y Culturas Paleohispánicas. (Zaragoza, 12 a 15 de marzo de 1997). Francisco Villar Liébana (ed. lit.), Francisco Beltrán Lloris (ed. lit.). 1997. pp. 535-544. .
 Sancho, Rosa María Pedrero. "Sobre la etimología de los términos: el caso del dios galaicolusitano Bandi/Bandue". In: Tes philies tade dora: miscelánea léxica en memoria de Conchita Serrano. Concepción Serrano Aybar (hom.). 1999. pp. 417-426. .
 Sancho, Rosa María Pedrero. "Los epítetos del teónimo occidental Bandue/i". In: Religión, lengua y cultura prerromanas de Hispania. Coord. por Francisco Villar Liébana, María Pilar Fernández Alvárez. 2001. pp. 541-560. .

Celtic goddesses
Lusitanian goddesses
Lusitanian gods
Gallaecian gods